Joseph Barrett may refer to:
Joseph Francis Barrett (1854–1918), American agricultural supply company executive
Joseph Osgood Barrett (1823–1898), American spiritualist
Joe Barrett (1902–1952), Gaelic football player

See also
Joe Barratt (1895–1968), English footballer